Juan de Zúñiga y Requesens, deceased 1586, was Viceroy of Naples, 1579–1582.

He was the sixth child of Juan de Zúñiga Avellaneda y Velasco (circa 1490 – 1546), Philip II's tutor, and Estefanía de Requesens y Rois de Liori (d. 1549), and the brother of Luis de Requesens y Zúñiga.

He was involved as an ambassador to Rome, together with his eldest brother, Luis. Later, as a governor of the Duchy of Milan and of the 17 provinces of Flanders, his naval force fought back the Ottoman vanguard. He then took part in the negotiations with Pius V to set up the Holy League to counteract naval piracy and the Turkish invasion of Suleiman I the Magnificent, (1520–1566), which led to the Battle of Lepanto in 1571, the successfully spanish bombing of the remnant of the Ottoman fleet at Alger and Tripoli, and the plundering of the costal region of Anatolia, which result in the decisive defeat of Ottoman invasion of Western and Southern Europe.

He then married the Sicilian noblewoman Giulia Barrese, thus becoming Prince of Pietraperzia. Giulia Barrese was the daughter of the infamous Girolamo Barrese, marquis of Pietraperzia, a title first awarded by Charles V at Mainz on 16 August 1526.

While in Naples he recruited ships and people (in support of the claims of King Philip II of Spain whose mother had been a Portuguese princess) to attack and conquer (with the support of a part of the Portuguese nobility) the city of Lisbon, Portugal. Closely involved with King Philip II of Spain he died in 1583, having been promoted to the Royal Council of Spain and the Spanish Council of War cabinets.

Some references
http://www.grandesp.org.uk/historia/gzas/mirandacast.htm
https://web.archive.org/web/20101012123758/http://www.apellidochacon.es/miranda.htm
http://europaromanica.proyectosbeta.com/es/glosario/detail.php?termId=2049
Gran Enciclopedia de España. 22 vols. with 11,052 pages, . See vol 22, page 11,049

1583 deaths
Viceroys of Naples
Spanish princes
Year of birth unknown